Ennerdale Bridge is a hamlet in the county of Cumbria, England. It is in the civil parish of Ennerdale and Kinniside. It had a total population taken at the 2011 census of 220.

Description
Ennerdale Bridge lies at the confluence of Croasdale Beck and the River Ehen and is on the border of the Lake District National Park that uses both watercourses as its boundary. The nearest town is Cleator Moor to its west.

The parish church, dedicated to St Mary, is Victorian - dating from 1858 - in the Romanesque style.

Etymology
The name Ennerdale means 'Anund's valley', from 'Anundar', genitive of the Old Norse personal name 'Anundr'/'Qnundr', and 'dalr' 'valley', cross-influenced by 'Ehen', the name of the local river.

The village has a community ran cafe, The Gather, which is a popular stop off for tourists walking the famed Wainwrights Coast-2-Coast walk.

Governance
The civil parish falls in the electoral ward of Ennerdale. This ward stretches north to Lamplugh with a total population taken at the 2011 census of  1,025.

See also

Listed buildings in Ennerdale and Kinniside
Ennerdale Water

References

External links

Brief description

Hamlets in Cumbria
Borough of Copeland